SloMo may refer to:

 Slow motion
 "SloMo" (Chanel song), 2021
 "SloMo" (San Cisco song), 2016

See also
 Slomó Köves, a Hungarian Orthodox rabbi